Gisela González (born 16 April 1997) is a Paraguayan handball player for CB Elche and the Paraguay national team.

She was selected to represent Paraguay at the 2017 World Women's Handball Championship.

References

1997 births
Living people
Paraguayan female handball players
20th-century Paraguayan women
21st-century Paraguayan women